Side Pawn Capture Rapid Attack Bishop*33 (横歩取り急戦３三角 yokofudori kyūsen san-san kaku) is a variation stemming from the Side Pawn Capture opening, in which White drops their bishop to 33 after they first trade pawns on the eighth file and then trade the bishops after Black takes White's side pawn.

Development

After Black takes the side pawn (see Side Pawn Capture for details), the Rapid Attack Bishop*33 variation starts with White making the bishop trade (8...Bx88+ 9.Sx88) like other rapid attack-style variations (such as the Double Side Pawn and Side Pawn B*45 variations).

9...B*33. Then, the B*33 variation proper begins with a bishop drop on the 33 square.

White is now threatening to capture Black's silver on 88, which is what would happen if Black moves 10.R-36 as in the usual Side Pawn Capture variations.

Iijima considers four possible responses for Black.

10.B*77 and 10.N-77 block White's bishop while 10.P*87 and 10.S-87 counterattack White's rook.

Iijima finds 10.N-77 to be the superior response resulting in a position that ultimately greatly favors Black.

The 10. P*87 response is the only one found in professional games: 
 in 1872,
 in 1913, 
 in 1957, 
 in 1981.

☗10.B*77

10.B*77. Black can respond by dropping a bishop to 77 simultaneously blocking White's dual attack on Black's silver on 88 and attacking White's rook on 86.

10...Bx77. However, White can simply trade bishops again checking Black's king.

From this position, the other options of either retreating the rook back to White's camp (10...R-82) or taking Black's side pawn (10...Rx76) aiming for deployment to the second file (...R-26) are less effective (although safer).

11.Nx77. Black is forced to capture the bishop with their knight.

Recapturing with their silver (11.Sx77) would allow White to capture their knight, promote their rook as well as checking their king (11...Rx89+), and the even worse option of recapturing with their gold (11.Gx77) would allow White to capture their silver on 88 with White's rook which would promote to a dragon (11...Rx88+) as well having the gold on 77 where it cannot effectively defend the king.

Note that this position after 11.Nx77 is similar to the Black's 10.Nx77 response (shown in the following section) except that White's bishop is now in hand where it can be utilized more effectively.

11...B*89. White then drops their bishop threatening to capture Black's gold on 78 which is defending the 88-silver and promoting to a horse.

☗12.K-68

12.K-68. Black's king moves to 68 in order to protect their gold.

This is the move that White is hoping for. From here, White can continue to attack forcefully. A safer alternative is for Black to attack White's rook with 12.S-78. (See §☗12.S-87 below.)

12...Bx78+ 13.Kx78. White trades their bishop for the gold forcing White's king to move to 78.

13...G*68. White drops their newly obtained gold in hand to 68 in a sacrifice attack.

☗14.Kx68

14.Kx68. King is forced to take the gold.

14...Rx88+. White's rook captures the silver and promotes checking the king.

☗15.K-59

15.K-59. King runs out of the line of White's promoted rook to 59.

K-59 is a poor choice since White will continue an even stronger attack.

After 15...S*68 16.K-48 Sx77+ 17.G*58 +Sx67 18.B*55 N*66 19.P*68 +Sx58 20.Gx58 +Rx99 21.S*49 Nx58+ 22.Sx58 +R-89, Black is in a better position. 

If Black attacks White's rook with 23.B*67, White can remain on the Black's back rank with 23...+R-79. If 23.Bx11+ or P*22, White can attack Black's knight with 23...P*28. If Black attack's White's gold with 23.N*24, then White can still defend with 23...G*33.

☗15.G*78

15.G*78. Black drops a gold to 78 blocking the promoted rook's attack. This is a better choice than 15.K-59.

15...+Rx99. White will capture the lance also attacking Black's gold on 49.

☗12.S-87

☗10.N-77

This is viewed as the Black's best response to White's attack by professional player 飯島栄治.

☗10.P*87

☗10.S-87

Comparison with Bishop-33 variation position

This Rapid Attack B*33 variation is not to be confused with the more common B-33 slow game variation that does not trade the bishops first.

Once White drops the bishop to 33, White's position is identical to the White's position in the B-33 variation. However, Black's formation differs in that Black has a bishop in hand and their left silver is on the 88 square instead of 79 as in the B-33 variation.

See also

 Side Pawn Capture
 Static Rook

Notes

Bibliography

 飯島, 栄治. 2014. 横歩取り超急戦のすべて. マイナビ

References

Shogi openings
Side Pawn Capture openings